The following is a list of events affecting Philippine television in 2008. Events listed include television show debuts, finales, cancellations, and channel launches, closures and rebrandings, as well as information about controversies and carriage disputes.

Events

January
 January 1:
 All of Solar's channels have ceased to air on Sky Cable, the Philippines' largest cable company. An insider claims that these troubles with SkyCable started when boxing champ Manny Pacquiao, whose fights Solar Entertainment has the exclusive right to air and distribute, moved from ABS-CBN, a sister company of Sky, to rival GMA. However, Solar signed a deal with local terrestrial channels ABC, RPN, SBN and RJTV for block-time programming, ETC, 2nd Avenue and C/S programming are seen on terrestrial TV. Currently, ETC shows can be seen on SBN and 2nd Avenue on RJTV on a test broadcast basis, while C/S will be seen on RPN.
 ETC ceased to air over Sky Cable as a channel on its own right. However, as part of block-time agreements with various terrestrial channels, ETC carried some of its programs over Southern Broadcasting Network Channel 21, a terrestrial UHF TV Station in Metro Manila and selected cities in the Philippines.
 January 5: Comedian Ruben Gonzaga wins the second season of Pinoy Big Brother: Celebrity Edition.

May
 May 5: The 4th originating station of Kapuso Network started airing is GMA Dagupan, which covers Pangasinan, Tarlac,  Nueva Ecija, Aurora, Zambales, Pampanga, Bulacan, Bataan, Benguet, La Union, Ifugao and Mountain Province after the establishment of Cebu, Iloilo and Davao together with the launching of Balitang Amianan.
 May 11: Miss Philippines Earth 2008, the 8th edition of Miss Philippines Earth pageant, was held at Crowne Plaza Galleria, Ortigas Center, Manila, Philippines. Miss Karla Henry of Cebu won the pageant.

June
June 7: 18-year-old Ejay Falcon wins the second season of Pinoy Big Brother: Teen Edition.

August
August 8: After 16 years of broadcast, ABC 5 ended its commercial operations on Friday evening at 22:00 (10:00 pm).
August 9: at 19:00 (7:00 pm) local time, ABC 5 was rebranded as TV5 and launched its new programs. However, despite the name change, the corporate name will still be Associated Broadcasting Company and Tonyboy Cojuangco will remain its CEO.
August 17: Gretchen Espina wins the first season of Pinoy Idol.

September
September 14 - Laarni Lozada emerged as the Grand Star Dreamer of Pinoy Dream Academy Season 2.

October
 October 5 - Philip Cesar Nadela emerged as the Little Grand Star Dreamer of Pinoy Dream Academy: Little Dreamers.
 October 8: ABS-CBN celebrated its 55th anniversary and unveils the TV plug "Beyond Television", describing ABS-CBN's transformation from a small television network in 1953 into a full-fledged media conglomerate with businesses beyond television.
 October 17: GMA Network opens their new studio complex which was known as the new GMA Network Studios Annex. The opening ceremony is in a red-carpet premiere. The new studio's inaugural is being part of the network's 58th anniversary, the presentation is titled Experience GMA: 58 Years of Glorious Television.

November
 November 9: Miss Earth 2008 was hosted by the Philippines at Clark Expo Amphitheater in Angeles City, Philippines. Karla Henry of the Philippines won the pageant.

Premieres

Unknown (dates)
 April: Mixing with the Best on 2nd Avenue
 Bakugan Battle Brawlers and Hayate Combat Butler on GMA 7

Unknown
 Del Monte Got2BFit Challenge on ABS-CBN 2
 Palmolive Shining Circle Of 10 Batch 2008 on ABS-CBN 2
 Harapan on ABS-CBN 2
 Busog Lusog on ABS-CBN 2
 Tagamends on IBC 13
 Asin at Ilaw on IBC 13
 Jungle TV on GMA 7
 3R on TV5
 Mustard TV on TV5
 Inside The Fishbowl on TV5
 Play with Me Sesame on TV5
 Elmo's World on TV5
 Thomas & Friends on TV5
 Pingu on TV5
 TV Patrol Northwestern Mindanao on ABS-CBN TV-9 Pagadian

Returning or renamed programs

Programs transferring networks

Finales
 January 4:
 RPN NewsWatch Aksyon Balita (RPN 9)
 RPN News Update (RPN 9)
 January 5: Pinoy Big Brother: Celebrity Edition 2 (ABS-CBN 2)
 January 11: 
 Kapamilya, Deal or No Deal (season 2) (ABS-CBN 2)
 Sine Novela: Pasan Ko ang Daigdig (GMA 7)
 RPN iWatch News (RPN 9)
 January 13: Boys Nxt Door (GMA 7)
 January 25:
 Lastikman (ABS-CBN 2)
 Patayin sa Sindak si Barbara (ABS-CBN 2)
 Ysabella (ABS-CBN 2)
 January 31: Magpakailanman (GMA 7)
 February 8:
 Zaido: Pulis Pangkalawakan (GMA 7)
 Spring Waltz (ABS-CBN)
 February 29:
 Sine Novela: My Only Love (GMA 7)
 Come Back Soon-Ae (GMA 7)
 Whammy! Push Your Luck (GMA 7)
 March 14: MariMar (GMA 7)
 March 15: Volta (ABS-CBN 2)
 March 16: Ka-Pete Na! Totally Outrageous Behavior (ABS-CBN 2)
 March 17: Noypi, Ikaw Ba ‘To? (ABS-CBN 2)
 March 19:
 Coffee Prince (GMA 7)
 Hana Yori Dango II (GMA 7)
 March 23: Love Spell (ABS-CBN 2)
 March 28: Maging Sino Ka Man: Ang Pagbabalik (ABS-CBN 2)
 March 29: Kakasa Ka Ba sa Grade 5? (season 1) (GMA 7)
 March 30: Kapuso Sine Specials (GMA 7)
 April 11: Dating Now (GMA 7)
 April 18: Devil Beside Me (GMA 7)
 April 19:
 1 vs. 100 (ABS-CBN 2)
 I Am KC (ABS-CBN 2)
 April 25:
 Kung Fu Kids (ABS-CBN 2)
 Palos (ABS-CBN 2)
 Kamandag (GMA 7)
 April 28: House of Hoops (ABC 5)
 May 8: E.S.P. (GMA 7)
 May 9: Maging Akin Ka Lamang (GMA 7)
 May 10: Star Magic Presents (ABS-CBN 2)
 May 16: Hana Kimi (Japanese version) (GMA 7)
 May 18: Tok! Tok! Tok! Isang Milyon Pasok (season 1) (GMA 7)
 May 22: American Idol: Season 7 (Q 11)
 May 23:
 Prinsesa ng Banyera (ABS-CBN 2)
 Maligno (ABS-CBN 2)
 May 29: The Legend (GMA 7)
 May 30: Hana Kimi (Taiwanese version) (ABS-CBN 2)
 June 7: Pinoy Big Brother: Teen Edition Plus (ABS-CBN 2)
 June 8: Gaby's Xtraordinary Files (ABS-CBN 2)
 June 13: Kaputol ng Isang Awit (GMA 7)
 June 27: Babangon Ako't Dudurugin Kita (GMA 7)
 July 11:
 Joaquin Bordado (GMA 7)
 Lobo (ABS-CBN 2)
 July 13: Tasya Fantasya (GMA 7)
 July 20: Jollitown (GMA 7)
 July 25: 
 Romantic Princess (ABS-CBN 2)
 Wheel of Fortune (ABS-CBN 2)
 August 2:
 That's My Job (ABC 5)
 Wow Mali Express (ABC 5)
 Saturday Night Blockbusters (ABC 5)
 August 3: Family Rosary Crusade (ABC 5)
 August 5: Mommy Elvie's Problematic Show (ABC 5)
 August 7: Judge Bao (ABC 5)
 August 8:
 Witch Yoo Hee (GMA 7)
 Big News (ABC 5)
 Net 25 Report (Net 25)
 Sentro (ABC 5)
 ABC News Alert (ABC 5)
 ABCinema (ABC 5)
 August 9: Songbird (GMA 7)
 August 17: Pinoy Idol (GMA 7)
 August 20: PBA on TV5 (TV5)
 August 22: Dalja's Spring (GMA 7)
 August 29:
 Magdusa Ka (GMA 7)
 Hello My Lady (GMA 7)
 August 30: Late Show with David Letterman (ETC on SBN 21)
 September 5: My Girl (ABS-CBN 2)
 September 19: They Kiss Again (ABS-CBN 2)
 September 25: 100% Pinoy! (GMA 7)
 October 3: Sweet Spy (GMA 7)
 October 5: Pinoy Dream Academy (season 2) (ABS-CBN 2)
 October 10:
 Ako si Kim Samsoon (GMA 7)
 GoBingo (GMA 7)
 October 17: Dyesebel (GMA 7)
 October 24:
 Ligaw Na Bulaklak (ABS-CBN 2)
 TV Patrol Laoag (ABS-CBN TV-7 Laoag)
 November 2: Tok! Tok! Tok! Isang Milyon Pasok (season 2) (GMA 7)
 November 7: Iisa Pa Lamang (ABS-CBN 2)
 November 8: Celebrity Duets (season 2) (GMA 7)
 November 12: Project Runway Philippines (season 1) (ETC on SBN 21)
 November 14: 
 Codename: Asero (GMA 7)
 El Cuerpo (ABS-CBN 2)
 Three Dads with One Mommy (ABS-CBN 2)
 Batang X: The Next Generation (TV5)
 November 19: HushHush (TV5)
 November 20: Rakista (TV5)
 November 25: World Records (GMA 7)
 November 27: Obra (GMA 7)
 November 28: Kahit Isang Saglit (ABS-CBN 2)
 December 5: My Husband's Woman (GMA 7)
 December 19: 
 Una Kang Naging Akin (GMA 7)
 Las Tontas (ABS-CBN 2)
 December 27: Nuts Entertainment (GMA 7)

Unknown dates
 July: Da Big Show (GMA 7)

Unknown
 Del Monte Got2BFit Challenge (ABS-CBN 2)
 Palmolive Shining Circle Of 10 Batch 2008 (ABS-CBN 2)
 Pinoy Mano Mano: Celebrity Boxing Challenge (ABS-CBN 2)
 Harapan (ABS-CBN 2)
 Basketball Tribe (ABS-CBN 2)
 Serbis on the Go (IBC 13)
 Amerika Atbp. (IBC 13)
 Krusada Kontra Korupsyon (NBN 4, RPN 9, IBC 13)
 Ratsada E (IBC 13)
 Mommy Academy (IBC 13)
 IBCinema Nights (IBC 13)
 Primetime Sinemax (IBC 13)
 Saint Peregrine: TV Sunday Mass (IBC 13)
 Jungle TV (GMA 7)
 The Sobrang Gud Nite Show With Jojo A All the Way! (Q 11)
 S.O.S.: Stories of Survival (ABC 5)
 TV Patrol Pagadian (ABS-CBN TV-9 Pagadian)

Ratings

Networks

Launches
 January 1:
 AXN Beyond Southeast Asia
 Balls
 Maxxx
 Velvet
 January 28: FashionTV
 August 20: MMDA TV
 May 1: ABC 24
 September 14: C/S Origin

Unknown dates
 March: Global News Network

Unknown
 SouthSpot

Stations changing network affiliation

The following is a list of television stations that have made or will make noteworthy network affiliation changes in 2008.

Rebranded
The following is a list of television stations that have made or will make noteworthy network rebranded in 2008.

Closures
 March 10: UniversiTV
 August 18: The Mabuhay Channel

Cable Channel are Moving
 November 2: Iglesia ni Cristo Channel Ch. 22  move to Ch. 136

Births
 January 24: Chlaui Malayao, child actress
 July 31: Raikko Mateo, child actor
 September 18: Chunsa Jung, child actress
 October 10: Sophia Reola, child actress

Deaths
 March 8: Carol Varga, 80, FAMAS-award-winning actress (born 1928)
 April 27: Marcos Mataro, 40, former member of Iglesia ni Cristo and ex-host of D'X-Man (born 1968)
 May 16: Henry Canoy, 74, founder of Radio Mindanao Network; grandfather of ABS-CBN reporter Jeff Canoy (born 1923)
 May 26: Dolly Aglay, 32, journalist with Reuters and Philippine Star (born 1966)
 June 7: Rudy Fernandez, 56, Filipino actor (born 1952)
 July 22: Gilbert Perez, 49, movie and TV director (born 1959)
 August 28: Zorayda Sanchez, 56, film and TV comedian (born 1952)
 September 1: Dely Magpayo, 88, radio host best known as "Tia Dely" (born 1920)
 September 21: Roger Mercado, 69, adoptive father and uncle of Jennylyn Mercado (born 1939)
 October 13: Khryss Adalia, 62, film and television director (born 1946)
 December 4: Manuel Yan, 88, former AFP Chief of Staff and diplomat; grandfather of the late Rico Yan (born 1920)
 December 7: Marky Cielo, 20, StarStruck 3's Ultimate Male Survivor and Ultimate Soul Survivor (born 1988)
 December 31: Rosendo delas Alas, 88, father of comedian Ai-Ai de las Alas (born 1920)

See also
2008 in television

References

 
Television in the Philippines by year
Philippine television-related lists